Ian Paul Cassidy born November 4, 1964 in Harrogate, West Riding of Yorkshire) is an English actor who has appeared mainly in American and Australian productions. In 2000 he played Cracker Bob in Highlander: Endgame and in 2001 he had a starring role in the drama series The Beast, which was cancelled after five episodes. Cassidy first came to fame as the host of Australian television show Kids Company, on Channel 10.  He also appeared in many Shakespeare productions across Australia. During the 1980s he participated in a number of Australian independent films. During the first years of the 1990s he appeared in many U.S. films like For the Boys, Wind and In the Line of Fire, and Dimension Film's Sci-Fi :Highlander: Endgame.  He has mainly appeared in American television series like The Pretender, EZ Streets, Pensacola: Wings of Gold, Walker, Texas Ranger, Drake & Josh, Desperate Housewives, Numb3rs, 24, The Pacific, Monk, The Bold and the Beautiful, The Young and the Restless and numerous others. He has also appeared in many video games for MachineGames, including the highly acclaimed  Wolfenstein: The New Order as Bobby Bram.

References

External links

Living people
English male television actors
English male film actors
1964 births
Male actors from Yorkshire
People from Harrogate